Saint Armogastes was a 5th-century Roman noble at the Vandal court in Africa who resisted conversion to Arianism. 
He was enslaved and put to work in the mines, then as a cowherd. His feast day is 29 March.
Archinimus and Saturus suffered at the same time, and were also reprieved from death.

Life

Armogastes was described in the Roman Martyrology as a count (comes). 
The text may be read as saying he was superintendent of the Theatre at Mascula, but this seems an unlikely occupation for a count. 
Gaiseric (c. 389–477), king of the Vandals in North Africa, renounced the Orthodox faith when he was a youth and professed Arianism.
He expected all his followers to do the same.
Armogastes refused, even after torture, but Gaiseric did not want to make a martyr out of him, so made him a slave and cowherd.
He died around AD 463.

Monks of Ramsgate account

The monks of St Augustine's Abbey, Ramsgate wrote,

Butler's account

The hagiographer Alban Butler wrote,

Liguori's account

Alphonsus Liguori (1696–1787) wrote in his History of Heresies and Their Refutation,

Notes

Sources

 

Saints from Roman Africa (province)
5th-century deaths